Anri du Toit, known professionally as Yolandi Visser (stylised as ¥o-Landi Vi$$er), is a South African rapper. She is the female vocalist in the rap-rave group Die Antwoord. Her partner in the group is Ninja, Watkin Tudor Jones.

Visser appeared in the 2015 Neill Blomkamp film Chappie.

Early life
As a baby, du Toit was adopted by clergyman, Reverend Ben du Toit, and his wife. She had an adoptive older brother, Leon, who died in 2015. Growing up, she has said she felt like she did not fit in or belong anywhere, and describes herself as 'a little punk' who frequently got into fistfights. At 16, du Toit was sent to a boarding school, Menlopark High School,  nine hours away from her family's home where she says that she blossomed among other creative and artistic-minded people.

Career

The Constructus Corporation 
Du Toit was asked by Watkin Tudor Jones (aka "Ninja") to lend vocals for his project The Constructus Corporation. She was credited as Anica the Snuffling. The band released their debut and only album The Ziggurat in 2003.

MaxNormal.TV 
Du Toit was a member of the South African 'corporate' hip-hop group MaxNormal.TV, in which she played the role of Max Normal's personal assistant. In MaxNormal.TV, she went by the stage name Yolandi Visser.

In the song 'Tik Tik Tik', du Toit's fictional backstory is detailed. The song claims that she was born into poverty in a large family, and eventually ran away out of boredom and loneliness. In 'Option A', she meets a drug dealer, and eventually begins working for him, transporting drugs in exchange for food and money. She becomes addicted to meth, and regrets her choices. In 'Option B', she ignores the drug dealer when he tried to talk to her, and instead begins working at a cafe, and rents a room there. She then is offered to join MaxNormal.TV after watching a rap show outside the cafe.

The group released their debut and only album Good Morning South Africa in 2008. A DVD featuring 13 skits, music videos and short films was released in the same year, titled Goeie Morge Zuid Afrika.

Die Antwoord 
Du Toit is currently a member of the South African rap-rave group Die Antwoord. The group was formed by du Toit, her then-partner Jones, and producer HITEK5000 (formerly referred to as DJ Hi-Tek and God). They have since added a second producer Lil2Hood.

Die Antwoord is part of the South African counterculture movement known as zef. For the band, du Toit goes by the stage name ¥o-Landi Vi$$er. She styled her hair into a bleach-blonde mullet at the start of the band, which was originally done to have an edge. She has said cutting her hair felt like a birth, and a statement of outsider and zef pride.

The band released their debut album $O$ in 2009. It was made freely available online and attracted international attention for their music video "Enter the Ninja". They briefly signed with Interscope Records, and left after pressure from the label to be more generic. du Toit explained that Interscope "kept pushing us to be more generic" in order to make more money: "If you try to make songs that other people like, your band will always be shit. You always gotta do what you like. If it connects, it's a miracle, but it happened with Die Antwoord.". They formed their own independent label, Zef Recordz and released their second album Tension through it.

They have since released two other albums; Donker Mag in 2014, and Mount Ninji and da Nice Time Kid in 2016. As well as this, du Toit played a self-styled role as ¥o-Landi Vi$$er in the 2015 Neill Blomkamp film Chappie.

Controversies

Andy Butler incident
In 2019, a video from 2012 surfaced, showing du Toit and Jones fighting with Hercules and Love Affair founder Andy Butler at the Australian festival Future Music while calling him insults, such as "faggot". Butler  is openly gay. After fighting him, du Toit and Jones alert security staff, and, while crying, du Toit claims that she was sexually assaulted in a bathroom by Butler. Later on in the video, Jones tells her that her performance was "Oscar-winning".

Jones responded on Facebook, claiming that the person who filmed the video edited it to make it seem like they were in the wrong. He claims that Butler harassed them in the days leading up to the fight, and that the fight had nothing to do with his being gay. Jones said he told du Toit to act as "dramatic as possible" about what Butler did to avoid getting detained by security after the fight. Die Antwoord and Butler were subsequently dropped from the lineup of several upcoming festivals. The incident went viral after a video was placed online seven years later by former Die Antwoord videographer Ben Jay Crossman.

Personal life 
Du Toit has a daughter, Sixteen Jones, who was born in 2005 from a previous relationship with Die Antwoord bandmate (Ninja) Jones. She also has three adopted children; a boy, Tokkie, and a girl, Meisie, were adopted in 2010 and another son Jemile was adopted in 2015.

In April 2022, Tokkie (born Gabriel du Preez) accused Du Toit and Jones of physical and sexual abuse against himself and his younger sister Meisie.

Discography

The Constructus Corporation 
 The Ziggurat (2003)

MaxNormal.TV 
 Rap Made Easy (2007)
 Good Morning South Africa (2008)

Die Antwoord 
 $O$ (2009)
 TEN$ION (2012)
 Donker Mag (2014)
 Mount Ninji and da Nice Time Kid (2016)
 House of Zef (2020)
 TBA (2022–2023)

Filmography 

 Goeie More Zuid Africa DVD (2008)
Tokoloshe (2011)
Umshimi Wam (2011)
Chappie (2015) – features "Baby's On Fire", "Ugly Boy", "Cookie Thumper" and "Enter the Ninja".

References

External links 

 
 Yolandi Visser Discography at discogs.com
 The Constructus Corporation Discography at discogs.com

Alternative hip hop musicians
Afrikaner people
South African dance musicians
21st-century South African women singers
South African rappers
Afrikaans-language singers
South African women rappers
Living people
Polydor Records artists
Die Antwoord members
South African adoptees
Women in electronic music
Women hip hop musicians
People from Sarah Baartman District Municipality
Year of birth missing (living people)